Rotadiscus is a genus of discoidal animal known from the Cambrian Chengjiang biota and classified with the eldoniids.

As with other eldoniids, it was originally thought to have been pelagic, but is now thought to be benthic.

References

Cambrian invertebrates
Fossils of China
Fossils of Canada
Prehistoric animal genera

Cambrian genus extinctions